Mark Holden (born 21 November 1960) is an English former professional darts player, who played in the Professional Darts Corporation events. His nickname was Top Banana.

Career
Holden qualified for two World Matchplay between 2002 and 2003, but never got past the Last 32 stage.
Holden qualified for three PDC World Darts Championships between 2003 and 2005, but never got past the Last 32 stage. He reached the quarter-finals of the 2002 World Grand Prix, before losing to 4–0 to eventual champion Phil Taylor.

World Championship performances

PDC
 2003: Last 32: (lost to Jamie Harvey 1–4) (sets) 
 2004: Last 40: (lost to Colin McGarry 0–3)
 2005: Last 32: (lost to Denis Ovens 1–4)

References

External links

1960 births
Living people
English darts players
Professional Darts Corporation associate players